Pedro Mata Domínguez (Madrid, 17 January 1875 – Madrid, 27 12 1946) was a Spanish novelist, playwright and poet. He was the grandson of Pedro Mata Fontanet.

His first novel Ganarás el pan… received the prize of La Ilustración Española (1902), while his most popular novel was Corazones sin rumbo (1916), a work awarded the palm of the Círculo de Bellas Artes.

Works

Novels

Independent novels
 Ganarás el pan… (1901)
 Ni amor ni arte (1907)
 Cuesta abajo (1908)
 La celada de Alonso Quijano (1909)
 En la boca del lobo (1910)
 El misterio de los ojos claros (1912)
 La catorce (1913)
 Los cigarrillos del Duque (1913)
 Corazones sin rumbo (1916)
 La paz del hogar (1916)
 El crimen de la calle de Ponzano (1917)
 La excesiva bondad (1917)
 Un grito en la noche (1918)
 Muñecos (1920)
 Irresponsables (1921)
 El hombre de la rosa blanca (1922)
 Teatro trágico (1922)
 Una aventura demasiado fácil (1923)
 El hombre que se reía del amor (1924)
 La reconquista (1929)
 El pájaro en la jaula (1930)
 Sinvergüenzas (1932)
 Las personas decentes (1935)
 Celosas (1945)

Novels in the series Más allá del amor
 Más allá del amor y de la vida (1926)
 Más allá del amor y de la muerte (1927)

Plays
 La Goya (1910)
 Uno menos (1912)
 El nublado (1932)

Poetry
 Para ella y para ellas: versos de amor (1918)

References

External links 
 Pedro Mata Domínguez en mcnbiografias.com

1875 births
1946 deaths
Spanish romantic fiction writers
20th-century Spanish poets
Spanish male poets
20th-century Spanish male writers